Todos Santos, Todos os Santos or Todos los Santos, or  (Portuguese or Spanish, 'All Saints') may refer to:

Places

Bolivia
Todos Santos, Beni, Bolivia
Todos Santos Lake, Bolivia

Brazil
Todos os Santos, Rio de Janeiro, Brazil
Todos os Santos River, Brazil
Baía de Todos os Santos, Brazil

Mexico
Todos Santos, Baja California Sur, Mexico
Todos Santos Airstrip
Bahía de Todos Santos, Mexico
Isla Todos Santos, Baja California, Mexico

Elsewhere
Todos Santos Cuchumatán, Guatemala
Todos Santos, original name of Concord, California, U.S.
Tosantos, formerly Todos Santos, Spain
Todos los Santos Lake, Los Lagos Region, Chile

Other uses
Colegio de Todos Los Santos, a private school in Argentina
Todos Santos Chocolates, a Santa Fe, New Mexico chocolatier
Todos Santos, a fictional arcology in the novel Oath of Fealty
Todos Santos, a dialect of Mam language, Guatemala
"Todos Santos", an episode of Hemlock Grove

See also

All Saints (disambiguation)
Hospital Real de Todos os Santos, a historic hospital in Lisbon, Portugal
Bahia de Todos-os-santos (book), by Jorge Amado, 1945